Dangal may refer to:

 Dangal, a type of Indian wrestling competition usually held in an akhara
 Dangal (film), a 2016 Hindi-language Indian film
 Dangal (soundtrack)
 Dangal TV, an Indian TV channel 
 Dangal (TV series), Philippine television drama
 Dangal language, a language of Chad
 Dangal dialect (Austronesian), a variety within the Watut language complex of Papua New Guinea
 Dangal, Iran, a village in Iran

See also 
 Danggal language, of Papua New Guinea
 Dangle (disambiguation)
 Dungal (disambiguation)
 Dagnall (disambiguation)